The 61st Directors Guild of America Awards, honoring the outstanding directorial achievements in films, documentary and television in 2008, were presented on January 31, 2009 at the Hyatt Regency Century Plaza. The ceremony was hosted by Carl Reiner. The nominees in the feature film category were announced on January 8, 2009, and the nominations for directorial achievement in television, documentaries and commercials were announced on January 9, 2009.

Winners and nominees

Film

Television

Commercials

Frank Capra Achievement Award
 Kim Kurumada

Robert B. Aldrich Service Award
 William M. Brady

Franklin J. Schaffner Achievement Award
 Scott Berger

Honorary Life Member
 Roger Ebert

References

External links
  

Directors Guild of America Awards
2008 film awards
2008 guild awards
2008 television awards
2008 awards in the United States
Direct
Direct